The men's singles three-cushion billiards competition at the 2013 World Games took place from 26 to 30 July 2013  at the Unidad Deportiva Alberto Galindo in Cali, Colombia.

Last 16

Last 8

Notes 
  Won match through two penalty-shootouts: 2–2, 1–2.

References

Three-cushion billiards - men's singles
Three-cushion billiards competitions